The Hortus Cliffortianus is a work of early botanical literature published in 1737.

The work was a collaboration between Carl Linnaeus and the illustrator Georg Dionysius Ehret, financed by George Clifford in 1735-1736. Clifford, a wealthy Amsterdam banker was a keen botanist with a large herbarium and governor of the Dutch East India Company. He had the income to attract the talents of botanists such as Linnaeus and artists like Ehret and Jan Wandelaar. Together at the Clifford summer estate Hartecamp, which was located south of Haarlem in Heemstede near Bennebroek, they produced the first scholarly classification of an English garden.

References 

 Hortus Cliffortianus, 1737, is online as an open access text at Biodiversity Heritage Library
Hortus Cliffortianus (black and white)
 George Clifford Herbarium at the NHM
 Noord-Hollands Archief, Haarlem

External links 

Botany books
Botany in Europe
1737 books
Botanical gardens in the Netherlands
Heemstede
Carl Linnaeus
18th-century Latin books
Biology and natural history in the Dutch Republic